The Clare Benedict Cup was a chess tournament for national teams from Western and Northern Europe, which took place 23 times from 1953 to 1979.

Overview and History

Foundation 

Clare Benedict (1871–1961), author and patron, was originally from Cleveland, Ohio, but moved to Switzerland in 1945, where she founded the tournament. She was a distant relative of author James Fenimore Cooper.

Benedict spent her twilight years on Lake Lucerne and met Max Euwe, who helped Clare in finding Alois Nagler (a Swiss chess player) and the Chess Society of Zurich, the ideal partners who appreciated her vision of a peaceful nations tournament in an exalted and sophisticated atmosphere.

Tournament Style 
The Clare Benedict Cup was organized as a round-robin tournament, where everyone plays against each other. Each team was made up of four players plus a substitute.  They played using only five boards at the first tournament in 1952. In the original rules it stated that six teams participated. However, in recent years this has increased to up to eight teams. The teams were first evaluated by game points. 

In 1954 in Zurich, they changed the tournament style from the teams playing against each other to a single player tournament consisting of 12 players. The German Grandmaster Lothar Schmid took first place followed by Erwin Nievergelt from Switzerland and finally ex-champion Max Euwe.

Participating Countries

Results

References

Chess in Switzerland
Chess in Europe
Chess competitions
1953 in chess
Recurring sporting events established in 1953
1953 establishments in Switzerland
Recurring sporting events disestablished in 1979
1979 disestablishments in Switzerland